The 2014 Women's Indoor Pan American Cup was the 6th edition of the Indoor Pan American Cup, an indoor hockey competition. The tournament was held in Montevideo, Uruguay, from 7–12 April.

Canada won the tournament for the second time, defeating Argentina 3–1 in the final. The United States won the bronze medal after defeating Uruguay 2–1 in penalties following a 1–1 draw.

Teams
The following four teams competed for the title:

Results

Preliminary round

Fixtures

Classification round

Semi-finals

Third and fourth place

Final

Awards

Statistics

Final standings

Goalscorers

References

External links
Pan American Hockey Federation

Women's Indoor Pan American Cup
Indoor Pan American Cup
International women's field hockey competitions hosted by Uruguay
Indoor Pan American Cup
Indoor Pan American Cup
Sports competitions in Montevideo
2010s in Montevideo
Pan American Cup